Jubilee USA may refer to:

 Jubilee USA Network, an alliance of national churches, diverse religious groups, and labor, environmental, and political organizations working on global financial reforms to protect vulnerable communities.
 Jubilee USA, originally named Ozark Jubilee, an ABC-TV country music program from 1958 to 1960